Rudlov is a village and obec (municipality) in Vranov nad Topľou District in the Prešov Region of eastern Slovakia.

History
In historical records the village was first mentioned in 1402.

Geography
The municipality lies at an altitude of 201 metres and covers an area of 16.042 km². It has a population of about 641 people.

References

External links
 
 
Rudlov - The Carpathian Connection

Villages and municipalities in Vranov nad Topľou District
Zemplín (region)